The 2019 Men's EuroHockey Junior Championship II was the 11th edition of the Men's EuroHockey Junior Championship II, the second level of the men's European under-21 field hockey championships organized by the European Hockey Federation. It was held from 14 to 20 July 2019 in Plzeň, Czech Republic.

Scotland won their third EuroHockey Junior Championship II title and were promoted to the 2022 Men's EuroHockey Junior Championship together with the other finalists Russia.

Qualified teams
The participating teams have qualified based on their final ranking from the 2017 competition.

Results

Preliminary round

Pool A

Pool B

Fifth to eighth place classification

Pool C
The points obtained in the preliminary round against the other team are taken over.

First to fourth place classification

Semi-finals

Third place game

Final

Statistics

Final standings

See also
2019 Men's EuroHockey Championship II
2019 Men's EuroHockey Junior Championship
2019 Men's EuroHockey Junior Championship III
2019 Women's EuroHockey Junior Championship II

References

Men's EuroHockey Junior Championship II
Junior 2
International field hockey competitions hosted by the Czech Republic
Sport in Plzeň
EuroHockey Junior Championship II
EuroHockey Junior Championship II
EuroHockey Junior Championship II